Launchpad is an anthology series of American independent short films produced by Walt Disney Pictures. The films are created by various filmmakers from diverse and underrepresented racial, social, and cultural backgrounds.

Submissions for Launchpad began in June 2019 and selected the final round of filmmakers were selected by Disney in December 2019, from a pool of 1,000 applicants. Disney financed the films and allowed the filmmakers to mentor with creative executives from various Walt Disney Studios film divisions, as well as the opportunity to receive educational classes provided by the American Film Institute. The first season was centered on the theme of "discover", which the participants were instructed to create stories around. Development process began in February 2020, but production on the first season of films was delayed due to the ongoing COVID-19 pandemic.

American Eid, Dinner Is Served, Growing Fangs, The Last of the Chupacabras, Let’s Be Tigers, and The Little Prince(ss), the six films of the first season of Launchpad, were released on Disney+ on May 28, 2021. The series has received praise for showcasing diversity and themes of inclusivity not typically addressed in mainstream Hollywood productions. A second season, focusing on the theme of "connection", is currently in development.

Films

Season 1 (2021)

American Eid 
Sisters Ameena and Zainab, two Muslim Pakistani immigrants, process the difficulties of living in a new place, including the lack of awareness their school has for their holiday of Eid.

Dinner Is Served 
A Chinese student attending an American boarding school tries out for a leadership position never attained by an international student.

Growing Fangs 
Val Garcia, a Mexican-American teen who is half human/half vampire, maintains her identity a secret from both worlds, until her human best friend shows up at her monster-infested school.

The Last of the Chupacabras 
A lonely Mexican-American woman struggling to carry on her traditions unknowingly summons a dark and ancient creature known as a chupacabra.

Let’s Be Tigers 
Avalon, a grief-stricken young woman who has recently lost her mother, is tasked to babysit a young boy named Noah for an evening.

The Little Prince(ss) 
Two young Chinese boys, Gabriel and Rob, befriend each other. Rob's father becomes suspicious about Gabriel’s feminine behavior and love of ballet and decides to intervene.

Season 2 (2023)

Music

Reception

Critical reception 
Kristen Yoonsoo Kim of The New York Times praised the series for approaching underrepresented groups of people across short films that are also made by minority filmmakers, found some of the shorts to be charming and sincere, while complimenting the dark tone of other films, stating they engage with somber stories and do not provide a predictable happy ending. Jade Budowski of Decider found the short film Dinner Is Served impressively moving and praised the performances of the cast members, while stating the other films still manage to provide stories that are delightful and essential from fresh perspectives. Ashley Moulton of Common Sense Media rated the series 4 out of 5 stars, acclaimed the presence of positives messages, citing self-authenticity and pride, and praised the presence of role models, stating the series highlights underrepresented groups, while complimenting the educational value for its depiction of different cultures. Josh Spiegel of SlashFilm rated the anthology series 8 out of 10, found that each short manages to have a distinct identity across the series, complimented the filmmakers for providing thoughtful and dark stories, and hoped the series to get a second season with new stories that stays both different and unexpected.

Accolades 
The series was nominated for Outstanding Short-Form Series - Comedy or Drama at the 2022 NAACP Image Awards. The series was nominated for Best Animation/Family for a TV/Streaming Series at the 2022 Golden Trailer Awards.

References

External links 
 

2021 short films
Disney+ original programming
American short films
Walt Disney Pictures films
Films about race and ethnicity
Film productions suspended due to the COVID-19 pandemic
2020s English-language films